Svetlozar (Zari) Todorov Rachev is a professor at Texas Tech University who works in the field of mathematical finance, probability theory, and statistics. He is known for his work in probability metrics, derivative pricing, financial risk modeling, and econometrics. In the practice of risk management, he is the originator of the methodology behind the flagship product of FinAnalytica.

Life and work
Rachev earned a MSc degree from the Faculty of Mathematics at Sofia University in 1974, a PhD degree from Lomonosov Moscow State University under the supervision of Vladimir Zolotarev in 1979, and a Dr Sci degree from Steklov Mathematical Institute in 1986 under the supervision of Leonid Kantorovich, a Nobel Prize winner in economic sciences, Andrey Kolmogorov and Yuri Prokhorov. Currently, he is Professor of Financial Mathematics at Texas Tech University.

In mathematical finance, Rachev is known for his work on application of non-Gaussian models for risk assessment, option pricing, and the applications of such models in portfolio theory. He is also known for the introduction of a new risk-return ratio, the "Rachev Ratio", designed to measure the reward potential relative to tail risk in a non-Gaussian setting.

In probability theory, his books on probability metrics and mass-transportation problems are widely cited.

FinAnalytica 
Rachev's academic work on non-Gaussian models in mathematical finance was inspired by the difficulties of common classical Gaussian-based models to capture empirical properties of financial data. Rachev and his daughter, Borjana Racheva-Iotova, established Bravo Group in 1999, a company with the goal to develop software based on Rachev's research on fat-tailed models. The company was later acquired by FinAnalytica. The company has won the Waters Rankings "Best Market Risk Solution Provider" award in 2010, 2012, and 2015, and also the "Most Innovative Specialist Vendor" Risk Award in 2014.

Awards and honors
 Fellow of the Institute of Mathematical Statistics
 Humboldt Research Award for Foreign Scholars (1995)
 Honorary Doctor of Science at Saint Petersburg State Institute of Technology (1992)
 Foreign Member of the Russian Academy of Natural Sciences

Selected publications

Books

Articles

References

External links 
 A definition of the Rachev Ratio
 FinAnalytica Inc

Bulgarian mathematicians
Living people
1951 births